International Consortium for the Advancement of Academic Publication (ICAAP) is non-profit publisher of academic journals, hosted at Athabasca University, Canada. It was founded as International Consortium for Alternative Academic Publication in 1998 by Mike Sosteric. It uses Open Journal Systems.

Notable journals 

Some notable journals published by the consortium are:
 Australasian Journal of Educational Technology
 Canadian Journal for Traditional Music
 Electronic Journal of Sociology
 International Journal of Baudrillard Studies
 Journal of Research Practice
 Radical Pedagogy
 E-JASL:  The Electronic Journal of Academic and Special Librarianship

References

External links 
 

Non-profit academic publishers
Publishing companies established in 1998